Southmoor Road is a residential road in Walton Manor, north Oxford, England.

Location
The road runs north–south, with a turn to the east to join Kingston Road, which runs parallel to the east, at its northern end. At the southern end, there is a junction with Longworth Road and Walton Well Road. Halfway along is a junction with Southmoor Place to the east, also linking it with Kingston Road. To the west is the Oxford Canal. To the south is the district of Jericho. The houses have been described as "large small house(s)" as opposed to the "small large house(s)" in the Chalfont Road area to the northeast.

History 
Houses in the road were originally leased between 1883 and 1895 as part of the North Oxford estate of St John's College. The houses were mainly designed by the architectural partnership of Wilkinson & Moore, with some by Harry Wilkinson Moore and J. C. Gray.

At the southern end of Southmoor Road, at the junction with Longworth Road and Walton Well Road, a drinking fountain was installed in 1885 on the site of a water spring.
It was erected by William Ward, who was earlier Mayor of Oxford for the years 1851 and 1861.
The fountain was designed by Harry Wilkinson Moore, architect of many of the houses in Southmoor Road, and carved in Portland stone by McCulloch of London.

In previous times, the road has been relatively down-market, but it is now a desirable area. Residents in the road celebrated its centenary with a street party on 22 June 1986.

See also 
 Northmoor Road

References 

Streets in Oxford